The 2023 F1 Academy is a planned motor racing championship that is scheduled to be the inaugural season of the F1 Academy, an all-female Formula 4-level racing series founded by Formula One. The championship is sanctioned by the Fédération Internationale de l'Automobile (FIA) under the management of Formula Motorsport Limited. Its season will commence on 28 April at Red Bull Ring and will conclude on 22 October supporting the United States Grand Prix at Circuit of the Americas.

Entries 
The following teams and drivers are under contract to compete in the 2023 championship. As the championship is a spec series, all teams will compete with an identical Tatuus F4-T-421 chassis and tyre compounds developed by Pirelli. Each car is powered by a 165-horsepower turbocharged 4-cylinder engine developed by Autotecnica.

Race calendar 
The calendar for the 2023 season was announced in February 2023:

Results

Season summary

Standings

Scoring system 
Points are awarded to the top ten classified finishers in the 30 minutes and 1 lap long Race 1 and 3, and to the top eight classified finishers in the reverse grid 20 minutes and 1 lap long Race 2. The pole-sitter in the each Race 1 and 3 also receives two points respectively, and one point is given to the driver who sets the fastest lap in the race if that driver finished inside the top ten. No point are awarded if the fastest lap time is achieved by a driver who was classified outside the top ten. No extra points are awarded to the pole-sitter in Race 2 as the grid for it is set by reversing the top eight qualifiers.

References

External links 
 

F1 Academy seasons
F1 Academy
F1 Academy